Vaughn Reginald Waddell (September 29, 1910 – March 7, 1980) was an American professional basketball player. He played in the National Basketball League for the Detroit Gems for eight games early in the 1946–47 season. He averaged 3.1 points per contest.

References 

1910 births
1980 deaths
Canadian men's basketball players
Detroit Gems players
Guards (basketball)
Basketball people from Ontario